Kamakhya Narayan Singh is an Indian film director and writer who works in Hindi cinema.

Kamakhya Narayan Singh started his career in television and later went on to do films. He is best known for his film Bhor (2021), which went to 28 film festivals globally. He is known for his documentary#Article 35A (2017) and 10 Days South Africa (2020). He received accolades for his documentary 'Justice delayed but delivered (2020), for which he won the Best Film on Other Social Issues.

He is also known for his works like Quest, a TV series Documentary and Music Ka Tadka'' a Music Television Show.

Filmography

Film

Awards and nominations

References

External links
 

Living people
Hindi-language film directors
Indian male screenwriters
Directors who won the Best Film on Other Social Issues National Film Award
Indian television directors
Film directors from Mumbai
Film producers from Mumbai
20th-century Indian film directors
21st-century Indian film directors
Gujarati people
1984 births